Michael Lynch (born 1951) is the Director of the Biodesign Institute for Mechanisms of Evolution at Arizona State University, Tempe, Arizona.

Biography
He held a Distinguished Professorship of Evolution, Population Genetics and Genomics at Indiana University, Bloomington, Indiana. Besides over 250 papers, especially in population genetics, he has written a two volume textbook with Bruce Walsh. Alongside this textbook he has also published two other books. He promotes neutral theories to explain genomic architecture based on the effects of population sizes in different lineages; he presented this point of view in his 2007 book "The Origins of Genome Architecture". In 2009, he was elected to the National Academy of Sciences (Evolutionary Biology). Lynch was a Biology undergraduate at St. Bonaventure University and received a B.S. in Biology in 1973. He obtained his PhD from the University of Minnesota (Ecology and Behavioral Biology) in 1977.

Honors and awards
2013: President of the Genetics Society of America

See also
Drift-barrier hypothesis

References

1951 births
Living people
University of Minnesota College of Biological Sciences alumni
Evolutionary biologists
Population geneticists
Indiana University faculty
Members of the United States National Academy of Sciences
Neutral theory